The eighth annual Four Hills Tournament in Germany and Austria was influenced by the German flag controversy, which led to the teams of the Warsaw pact zone withdrawing from the tournament. In addition, Finland and Norway decided not to compete due to preparations for the upcoming 1960 Winter Olympics. Finland ultimately sent prospective athletes.

The tournament was instead dominated by the host country and for the first time, the Four Hills were won by a West German ski jumper, Max Bolkart.

German Flag Controversy

For ten years after its declared independence, the German Democratic Republic continued to use the German tricolour for official use. In October 1959, they finally adapted a distinctive flag, the East German coat of arms in front of the tricolour. The Four Hills tournament starting in December 1959 was one of the first sporting events on West German ground where East German athletes were supposed to compete under the new flag.

However, it was prohibited to display the new East German flag under West German law and the hosts refused to do so in Oberstdorf. The strong East German delegation including defending champion Helmut Recknagel refused to compete under the circumstances and withdrew. Teams of countries that accepted East Germany as a sovereign nation and thus their flag, withdrew in solidarity (Czechoslovakia, Poland and the Soviet Union). Originally, it was announced that they would compete at the two events in Austria.

Austria, however, did not yet have diplomatic relations with the GDR and it was left to the local government to deal with the situation. Innsbruck mayor Alois Lugger decided not to display the East German flag either. Although he offered compromises, such as the use of the Olympic German flag or using no flags at all, the Warsaw pact teams declared their withdrawal on the day of the Innsbruck event and left the day after.

Participating nations and athletes

Many notable absences include the teams from East Germany, the Soviet Union, Poland, Czechoslovakia, Norway and the top athletes from Finland.

A French team, however, competed at the Four Hills for the first time.

Results

Oberstdorf
 Schattenbergschanze, Oberstdorf
30 December 1959

Garmisch-Partenkirchen
 Große Olympiaschanze, Garmisch-Partenkirchen
01 January 1960

With his ninth place in Garmisch-Partenkirchen, Jacques Charland became the first non-European with a Top-Ten-finish at a Four Hills event.

Innsbruck
 Bergiselschanze, Innsbruck
03 January 1960

Thanks to close results so far, the overall ranking was still closely contested after the first two events. In Innsbruck however, Max Bolkart increased his lead to almost twenty points after a third, clearer victory.

Curiously, three out of four Swedish competitors shared 21st place, equal in points (198.5).

Bischofshofen
 Paul-Ausserleitner-Schanze, Bischofshofen
06 January 1959

Max Bolkart was the third athlete within seven years to win the first three events but fail to achieve the 'Grand Slam' in Bischofshofen. He still became the first West German to win the tournament however, as Alwin Plank almost, but not quite closed the gap in the overall ranking.

The Austrians achieved their first triple victory, a feat that only the Finnish had produced so far (twice in 1954-55).

Final ranking

References

External links
 FIS website
 Four Hills Tournament web site

Four Hills Tournament
1959 in ski jumping
1960 in ski jumping